Marianne Murciano (Sirott) co-hosted a morning program called "Fox Thing in the Morning" on Chicago's Fox affiliate (WFLD) from 1993–2000, with husband, Bob Sirott. In 2005 Murciano conducted some co-interviews with Sirott for Chicago Tonight.  Murciano was born in Havana, Cuba, and moved to Miami in 1961.

External links

Television anchors from Chicago
Living people
Year of birth missing (living people)